Aid Convoy is a British charitable organisation running and supporting various humanitarian aid projects, mostly in Eastern Europe. Its aims are achieved primarily by means of running convoys.

Projects
Aid Convoy's projects focus on Albania and Ukraine. Past work has encompassed further Balkans countries, particularly Kosovo, and Aid Convoy has also lent support and expertise to projects in Burkina Faso and Gaza.

Albania
The organisation raised funds for digging a borehole to supply clean water to the residents of the Bathorë shanty town, just outside the capital Tirana.

Ukraine
Working primarily in the area affected by the Chernobyl nuclear disaster, Aid Convoy is closely partnered with the "Our Generation" youth group whose educational and welfare projects include:
 Providing a safe and alcohol-free social space for young people
 Volunteering at orphanages
 Running the Anomaly theatre group which runs drug- and HIV-awareness physical theatre productions at schools across the country and also in Poland
 Publishing the "BiT" newspaper
 Training and encouraging similar youth groups in other cities

The youth group, based in Chernihiv is also supported by other charitable organisations, and Aid Convoy is also involved with supporting a number of other initiatives including hospitals, orphanages, schools and universities.

Ethos and methodology
The organisation is entirely operated by unpaid volunteers, who are sourced both in the area which is the target of the assistance, and in the donor countries.

Funds and supplies are generally raised through special fundraising events and from members of the public, private companies, and trust funds, but not from government nor major aid agencies. The organisation claims that its small scale and localised fundraising helps it to make its supporters feel empowered and involved, and also enables the provision of feedback with a high level of detail.

The small scale of the organisation and its policy of working directly with small local projects in its target countries are intended to reduce inefficiency and potential for corruption, through local knowledge and the ability to quickly react to changing circumstances.

Supplies are delivered by volunteers in small convoys of vehicles, rather than by commercial freight methods, to allow for meetings between the volunteers and the people to whom they are delivering supplies.

History
Aid Convoy evolved from a community development group, The Kemptown Network, in the Kemptown area of the British town of Brighton. In early 1999 meetings to discuss supporting Kosovan refugees were organised by founding members Giles Hippisley and Kieran Turner (the latter being now Director of Aid Convoy and a Green Party politician).

After investigations which included consulting refugees in the UK at the Tinsley House Immigration Removal Centre, it was decided to send aid directly, using whatever vehicles were available, to refugee camps around Kosovo. It was decided that support must be equally offered to suffering civilians from both the ethnic Albanian and the Serb populations.

The first trip, consisting of five vehicles, was run in conjunction with Workers' Aid for Kosova, and delivered to a support organisation based in Tirana, Albania.

Immediately upon the return of the first convoy, it was decided to run a second trip, which was sent to a refugee camp in the Republic of Macedonia, on the border of Kosovo, with the support of the United Nations, and in conjunction with Canterbury-based Charity, British Humanitarian Aid, and Tewkesbury-based Charity Tewkesbury Independent Aid. In the event, the first vehicle specifically purchased for the group broke down en route. However, the Dodge 50 Series 5.6 ton truck was rescued thanks to Simon Mayo of BBC Radio 1. It arrived in time to rejoin the rest of the forty-vehicle convoy in a United Nations compound in the Republic of Macedonia, but elected to deliver its load directly to the village of Pirok (near Tetovo) rather than the neighbouring refugee camp, after meeting local officials who explained that the village was overrun with refugees and receiving no mainstream assistance.

By now the group was clearly going to continue to exist, distinct from The Kemptown Network, and became known as "Brighton Lifeline for Kosova". After subsequently incorporating a Brighton student-run group (which had sent six vehicles to Kosovar refugees in Albania), the conjoined committees decided to adopt the name "Brighton Lifeline Humanitarian Aid".

The next convoy was one of the first Western charitable convoys to enter Kosovo itself after the NATO bombing campaign of spring 1999, and travelled with sponsorship from the University of Aberdeen Students' Representative Council (now Aberdeen University Students' Association), and in conjunction with Workers' Aid for Kosova. The convoy's six vehicles travelled to Pristina and Kosovska Mitrovica, where the University of Prishtina Students' Union and various miners' trade unions were supported.

During this month-long project the team also developed contacts in Đakovica and Prizren, and in Rubik, Albania.

The group continued to travel to Kosovo, often in conjunction with British Humanitarian Aid and Tewkesbury Independent Aid. Successes of these combined convoys included the delivery of ambulances and surgical equipment to a hospital in Gnjilane. The organisation has met and worked with representatives of other NGOs including CO-PLAN, the International Organization for Migration, the International Rescue Committee, and the British Council.

In 2001, with large amounts of international redevelopment support entering Kosovo, it was decided that the group's particular form of support would be of greatest value in Ukraine, working with colleagues from Charities met during the Kosovo work, including Tewkesbury Independent Aid again, and also Horsham-based Bear Essential Aid. The initial target for aid was the "Aratta centre for children and families" (Aratta, for short), a Ukrainian public organisation which supports people living with the legacy of Chernobyl. The work with Aratta continued for several years, later evolving into work with the Our Generation youth group, as well as hospitals, orphanages and schools in the area.

During 2002–03 the organisation was renamed Aid Convoy, in order to leave behind the association with only one British town.

Further work in Albania began in 2003 following a novel fund-raising event, "Canvas", which took the form of a raffle of works of art in Brighton. The success of that event led to an ongoing series of similar high-value art raffles for both Aid Convoy and other charities.

Since 2009, consultancy and support has been given to Viva Palestina and other charities, with convoys delivering medical aid to Gaza.

In 2010, Aid Convoy's Director Kieran Turner was kidnapped – and later released – while supporting the Road to Hope aid convoy to Gaza.

References
Footnotes

Bibliography
 "Shelled, stranded and still hoping to return to Kosova"; The Argus (newspaper); Newsquest, Brighton, Thursday August 19, 1999
 RAC staff newsletter (autumn issue, 1999); The Royal Automobile Club; London, 1999
 Turner, Kieran: "Aid Convoy — humanitarian aid & community development"; Brighton Lifeline Humanitarian Aid, Brighton, 2003

External links
 Aid Convoy website
 Our Generation – Ukrainian youth group and a major partner of Aid Convoy
 Aratta – Ukrainian charity for families near Chernobyl (site in Russian)
 Details of UK Immigration Removal Centres (including Tinsley House, mentioned above)

Humanitarian aid organizations in Europe
Charities based in the United Kingdom
Organizations established in 1999
1999 establishments in the United Kingdom